Ian Todd (born 11 September 1961) is a former Australian rules footballer who played with Melbourne in the Victorian Football League (VFL).

Reference list

External links 

Profile at Demonwiki

1961 births
Australian rules footballers from Victoria (Australia)
Melbourne Football Club players
Living people